Dick Clark's New Year's Rockin' Eve (NYRE) is an annual New Year's Eve television special broadcast by ABC. The special broadcasts primarily from New York City's Times Square and prominently features coverage of its annual ball drop event, along with live and pre-recorded musical performances by popular musicians from Times Square and Hollywood. Since 2016–17, the special has regularly included performances and coverage of midnight festivities from other locations, including New Orleans (Central Time) and San Juan (Atlantic Time, since 2021–22).

Its creator and namesake was the entertainer Dick Clark, who conceived New Year's Rockin' Eve as a younger-skewing competitor to Guy Lombardo's popular and long-running New Year's Eve big band broadcasts on CBS. The special first aired on December 31, 1971; its first two editions were broadcast by NBC, and hosted by Three Dog Night and George Carlin, respectively, with Clark anchoring coverage from Times Square. In 1974–75, the program moved to its current home of ABC, and Clark assumed the role of host. Since 2000–01, the special has broadcast segments in prime time alongside the main late-night broadcast; initially occupying the 10:00 p.m. ET/PT hour, from 2011–12 onward the special has occupied the entirety of ABC's primetime schedule on New Year's Eve.

Following the death of Guy Lombardo and the decline of CBS's specials, New Year's Rockin' Eve grew in popularity and became ingrained in pop culture—prompting Clark himself to make appearances on other programs in parodies of his role. New Year's Rockin' Eve has consistently remained the highest-rated New Year's Eve special broadcast by the United States' major television networks; its 2012 edition peaked at 22.6 million home viewers—not including viewers watching from public locations, which were not measured by Nielsen at the time.

Dick Clark hosted New Year's Rockin' Eve annually from 1973 through 1999 and from 2001 through 2004. For 2000, in lieu of New Year's Rockin' Eve, Clark joined overall host Peter Jennings as a guest co-host in Times Square for ABC News' day-long ABC 2000 Today broadcast. In December 2004, Clark suffered a stroke, which resulted in Regis Philbin serving as guest host. Due to lingering speech impediments from the stroke, Clark ceded hosting duties to Ryan Seacrest the following year (with the special having subsequently been billed as Dick Clark's New Year's Rockin' Eve with Ryan Seacrest since 2008), but he continued to make limited appearances as a co-host until his death in 2012. Hosting solo since the 2012–13 edition, Seacrest has typically been joined by Jenny McCarthy as a correspondent from Times Square (McCarthy ceded correspondent duties following the 2019 edition), with Ciara serving as the presenter of the Hollywood concert segments. Through its deal with Dick Clark Productions, New Year's Rockin' Eve will remain on ABC through at least 2024.

Format
New Year's Rockin' Eve is primarily broadcast from Times Square in New York City, providing coverage of the New Year's Eve festivities held there, and culminating with the long-running ball drop approaching midnight. The lead-up to the program features performances by popular musicians; some of these performances (particularly headlining acts) originate live from a stage in Times Square, but the majority of the performances are presented via segments (billed as the "Billboard Hollywood Party") recorded in Los Angeles.

Since 2005, Ryan Seacrest has hosted the live show outside in Times Square, joined by a celebrity correspondent providing additional reports from attendees. From his return and until his death, Dick Clark hosted a limited number of segments from Times Square Studios throughout the broadcast, including the countdown. Clark carried on with his tradition of kissing his wife, Kari Wigton, at midnight.

Since the 2000–01 edition, the special has begun with a segment in prime time, billed as Dick Clark's Primetime New Year's Rockin' Eve, and currently billed for ratings purposes as "Primetme – Part 1". Initially airing at 10:00 p.m. ET/PT, the prime time block was extended to 8:00 p.m. ("Part I", with the remaining primetime block billed as "Part II") beginning with the 2011–12 edition. From 2011–12 to 2013–14, "Part I" primarily featured retrospectives drawing from the Dick Clark Productions library, including the top New Year's Rockin' Eve performances of all-time (in honor of the special's 40th anniversary), and the top women in music. 

Following a break for late local programming (such as late-night newscasts), the second block of the program is broadcast, which as of 2022–23 features coverage of midnight celebrations in the Atlantic Time Zone from the U.S. territory of Puerto Rico at 11:00 p.m. ET, Eastern Time from the Times Square ball drop at 11:59 p.m. ET, and for Central Time from the Jackson Square fleur-de-lis drop in New Orleans. After the conclusion of live coverage, the show continues with the remainder of the pre-recorded concert segments. The late-night segment runs up to approximately 2:10 a.m. ET/PT, and has run as late as 3:00 a.m. ET/PT in the past.

History

Conception and premiere 

Prior to the premiere of New Year's Rockin' Eve, the most well-known New Year's Eve program was the annual big band remote of bandleader Guy Lombardo and his Royal Canadians, broadcast from the ballroom of the Waldorf-Astoria Hotel. Guy Lombardo hosted 48 straight New Year's Eve broadcasts on CBS until his death in 1977, beginning on radio in 1928 (and for a period, splitting with NBC Radio following midnight ET), and on CBS Television from 1956 to 1976 (which also featured coverage of the ball drop in Times Square). Lombardo was also well known for his band's performance of the song "Auld Lang Syne" at midnight, which helped make the standard synonymous with the New Year's holiday in North America.

At the time, Dick Clark was well known as the host of American Bandstand, a music program produced from the studios of Philadelphia television station WFIL-TV (now WPVI-TV) and broadcast by ABC (which itself aired a New Year's Eve special on December 31, 1959).

In the 1970s, Clark felt that Guy Lombardo's New Year's specials were outdated and did not appeal well to younger viewers; he believed that only older viewers would be interested in big band music accompanied by "people dancing cheek-to-jowl in their tuxedos and funny hats". In response, he decided to produce a more youthful New Year's Eve special of his own to compete. Clark's new program would be known as New Year's Rockin' Eve, a name chosen to signify the major contrast between his special and the more formal atmosphere of Guy Lombardo's special. The first edition, Three Dog Night's New Year's Rockin' Eve, was aired by NBC on December 31, 1971, and was hosted by the members of the rock band Three Dog Night. The special featured pre-recorded musical performances from the ballroom of the Queen Mary in Long Beach, California by Helen Reddy, Billy Preston, and Three Dog Night. Clark served as a reporter from Times Square for live coverage of the ball drop and arrival of 1973.

The second special, New Year's Rockin' Eve 1973, also on NBC, was hosted by comedian George Carlin and featured pre-recorded musical performances by The Pointer Sisters, Billy Preston, Linda Ronstadt and Tower of Power once again from the Queen Mary ballroom. Beginning with the 1974 edition, the program moved to ABC and Clark assumed hosting duties; billed as Chicago's New Year's Rockin' Eve 1975 and seen as part of ABC's Wide World of Entertainment late-night block, the first ABC edition was headlined by the rock band Chicago, with guests The Beach Boys, The Doobie Brothers, Herbie Hancock and Olivia Newton-John, in segments pre-recorded at MGM Studios in Hollywood.

Rise in popularity
 Following Guy Lombardo's death in 1977, CBS and the Royal Canadians attempted to continue their New Year's Eve broadcasts from the Waldorf-Astoria for 1977–78. However, the effects of Lombardo's absence led to a decline in viewership, allowing New Year's Rockin' Eve to overtake the Royal Canadians in viewership in only its sixth year on-air. The threat of the new special also prompted CBS to drop the Royal Canadians entirely in 1979 in favor of a new special, Happy New Year, America, which premiered for New Year's Eve 1979–80. With its recent success, Clark began hoping that New Year's Rockin' Eve would become a television tradition of its own, lamenting that "Lombardo would always win [in New York] because of the Waldorf and 35 years of tradition, but we finally got it wrested." Clark's hopes soon became reality, as New Year's Rockin' Eve had displaced Guy Lombardo as the most popular and most-watched New Year's Eve special on American television in the years following.

The 1980 edition was co-hosted by Erin Moran and John Schneider of Happy Days and The Dukes of Hazzard respectively, and continued with Clark's goal to showcase acts that represented the previous year by featuring Barry Manilow, Blondie, Chic, The Oak Ridge Boys, and the Village People as performers. The 1988 edition was co-hosted by China Beach cast members Marg Helgenberger and Brian Wimmer from the Cocoanut Grove club at the Ambassador Hotel. In 1990, New Year's Eve fell on a Monday, that night ABC broadcast the Monday Night Football game between the Los Angeles Rams and the New Orleans Saints. Fearing that his special wouldn't start on time, Clark asked ABC to move the start time one hour early to 8 PM EST so the special would run at its normal time. Mark Curry and Holly Robinson of the ABC sitcom Hangin' with Mr. Cooper co-hosted for 1993–94, with segments at Walt Disney World featuring performances by acts such as Brooks and Dunn and Kiss, along with the marriage of two California firefighters, Laura Turpin and Bob Hutnyan.

The 1994–95 edition was co-hosted with Margaret Cho and Steve Harvey, and included musical performances from Melissa Etheridge, Hootie & the Blowfish and Salt-N-Pepa.

The 1996–97 edition was co-hosted by Stacey Dash and Donald Faison of the ABC comedy series Clueless, and included performances by Jann Arden, Kiss, "Weird Al" Yankovic, The Presidents of the United States of America, and The Tony Rich Project. This edition also marked the 25th anniversary of New Year's Rockin' Eve; Clark marked this accomplishment by discussing the greatest challenges he had faced hosting the special; including being unable to hear his director over the loud crowds of Times Square, harsh weather conditions, and a year where the emcee had to contend with a group of 30 nude attendees in the background. Clark aimed to continue hosting the special through the year 2000. Ultimately, Clark hosted the program nearly uninterrupted through 2004. The late-night portion of the 1997–98 edition was followed by a second, hour-long special at 1:05 a.m., After New Year's Eve, which was hosted by David Sanborn and featured Boz Scaggs, Isaac Hayes, Dr. John, Joan Osborne, Lou Reed, and Naughty by Nature.

The popularity of New Year's Rockin' Eve also resulted in Clark making appearances on other television series to reference his role. During a Y2K-themed short in The Simpsons 1999 Halloween special "Treehouse of Horror X", Clark made a cameo appearance hosting a New Year's Eve event in Springfield. The Y2K bug caused the emcee to melt, exposing him as a robot. In an interview following the episode's airing with its writer, Ron Hauge, Clark said that the episode gave the "biggest response" he had ever gotten from anything he had ever done. Clark made a further appearance during the pilot episode of fellow Matt Groening series Futurama, "Space Pilot 3000", where Clark's head (as preserved in a jar) hosts New Year's Rockin' Eve 3000. In the 1994 film Forrest Gump,  footage of Clark from the first edition of New Year's Rockin' Eve is seen on a television at a bar during a scene of the film taking place on New Year's Eve in 1972. New Year's Rockin' Eve was also the subject of an episode of the sitcom Friends, "The One with the Routine", in which Janine Lecroix invites Joey, Ross, and Monica to attend a studio taping for New Year's Rockin' Eve as audience members.

ABC 2000 Today

On December 31, 1999, in lieu of New Year's Rockin' Eve, ABC News presented ABC 2000 Today, a day-long telecast hosted by Peter Jennings which, as part of a consortium of broadcasters, presented coverage of international and U.S. festivities celebrating the arrival of the year 2000. Clark joined Jennings and ABC News reporter Jack Ford as correspondents for coverage from Times Square. They were among the key members of the team of more than 1,000 members of the ABC News division in New York, London, and elsewhere around the world that were part of the broadcast, which also included correspondents/anchors Charles Gibson, Diane Sawyer, Barbara Walters, and Sam Donaldson and London Bureau chief Rex Granum. They were all under the direction of ABC's Roger Goodman. The ABC 2000 Today telecast overall also received a Peabody Award. Reflecting on the event, Clark was enthusiastic about his participation, feeling that New Year's Eve 2000 was one of the biggest nights he had ever spent in Times Square.

2001 primetime expansion
New Year's Rockin' Eve returned to ABC the following New Year's Eve for the arrival of 2001. The 2000–01 edition also introduced a new primetime hour at 10:00 p.m. ET/PT, which featured additional segments and music performances to lead into the main program. Clark felt positive about the program's expansion into primetime – believing that viewers, no matter where they were, wanted to know what was going on in Times Square on New Year's Eve. Clark was joined by Fox & Friends anchor Steve Doocy, and Madison Michelle as reporters in Times Square. Comedian Wayne Brady hosted concert segments in Hollywood, which included performances by  98 Degrees, Baha Men, Boyz II Men, Lonestar, and Third Eye Blind among others.

The 2002 edition of New Year's Rockin' Eve, its 29th edition, featured pre-recorded concert performances from tours by Aerosmith, Destiny's Child, and Elton John during the primetime hour, followed by studio segments (again hosted by Wayne Brady) featuring performances by Blink-182, Bush, Busta Rhymes, Jessica Simpson, LFO, The O'Jays, and Pink. The primetime hour of New Year's Rockin' Eve 2002 was also preceded by ABC 2002, a follow-up to the ABC 2000 Today special, hosted by Peter Jennings from the Rose Center for Earth and Space. The two-hour special featured a "meaningful and reflective" view on New Year's celebrations from around the world, and also included performances by Arlo Guthrie, Sting, and U2. Clark personally felt that 2002, since it was the first in the wake of the September 11 attacks, was the most "nerve-racking" New Year's Eve he had ever experienced.

2005: Dick Clark's stroke and effects on Rockin' Eve

On December 8, 2004, it was reported that Clark had been hospitalized after suffering from a minor stroke. Despite Clark indicating his participation in New Year's Rockin' Eve 2005 in a prepared statement, reports soon surfaced that the stroke may have been serious enough to prevent him from hosting at all. It was officially announced on December 14 that Dick Clark would not be hosting, and that Regis Philbin would fill in for Clark. In a statement, Clark said that he was thankful that Philbin was able to quickly step in on short notice to host the show, and hoped that he would do a good job. Philbin was optimistic about his role, considering it the "best temp job ever".

Various personalities paid tribute to Clark throughout the night on New Year's Eve; the New Year's Rockin' Eve broadcast featured special celebrity messages for Clark, and revelers in Times Square were seen with signs saluting Clark. During CNN's coverage, revelers in Times Square told CNN's Jason Carroll that Philbin was "all right" filling in for Clark (but still had Anderson Cooper and Carroll too). Mayor Michael Bloomberg also spoke with Philbin on Clark's absence during the show, noting that "it isn't that we don't like Regis, but we want [Clark] back next year."

Philbin's hosting received mixed reviews: Richard Huff of the New York Daily News noted that Philbin's hosting was "stiff" at first, and suggested that he would have performed better if he had a co-host to interact with like his daytime talk show Live with Regis and Kelly. In conclusion, he considered Philbin's performance to be "suitable – although not spectacular". Virginia Heffernan of The New York Times believed that Philbin was feeling "surprisingly nervous" in his role at host, and felt that "rowdy crowds" (which Philbin chose to avoid by staying in the studio) and the success of Rod Stewart's career (which Philbin pounced on to promote his new album, "When You're Smiling") were bothering him.

2006: Dick Clark's return

In August 2005, ABC announced that Dick Clark would return to New Year's Rockin' Eve for its 2006 edition, marking his first television appearance since the stroke. For that broadcast, it was also announced Clark would be joined by a new co-host, media personality and American Idol host Ryan Seacrest. Seacrest had previously hosted Fox's competing New Year's Eve Live—which, ironically, would be hosted by Philbin that year. Speaking to USA Today, Seacrest reminisced on having watched New Year's Rockin' Eve in his childhood, stating that "I knew when I was on other shows, I knew we weren't going to beat Dick Clark. He is New Year's Eve." As a part of a long-term deal with Dick Clark Productions, Seacrest also became an executive producer for the special. In an interview with People Magazine in December 2005, Seacrest revealed that while Clark had not completely recovered from the stroke, and that his speech was not exactly like how it was beforehand, Clark had made great progress since the original diagnosis.

Alongside pre-recorded performances from Hollywood hosted by actress and pop singer Hilary Duff, the 2006 edition also featured a live performance by Mariah Carey directly inside Times Square – the first such performance in the show's history. Live performances from Times Square became a regular feature during future editions of New Year's Rockin' Eve.

During the program, Clark made limited on-air appearances, but still conducted his traditional countdown, and also recollected on his recent experiences:

Public curiosity over Clark's condition and his return to television helped Dick Clark's New Year's Rockin' Eve 2006 draw in over 20 million viewers throughout the night, and score a 7.1 audience share among the key demographic of 18- to 49-year-olds. Reaction to Clark's appearance was mixed. While some TV critics (including Tom Shales of The Washington Post, in an interview with the CBS Radio Network) felt he was not in good enough shape to do the broadcast, stroke survivors and many of Clark's fans praised the emcee for being a role model for people dealing with post-stroke recovery. The New York Times Brian Stelter compared Seacrest's new role as co-host of Rockin' Eve to being like a "traffic cop", "tossing to bands and correspondents and to Mr. Clark for the countdown".

2007–2011: Ryan Seacrest becomes host
Following the 2006 edition, Dick Clark Productions announced that Seacrest had agreed to remain a host for future editions of New Year's Rockin' Eve. As he was still afflicted with speech impediments that resulted from dysarthria, a lingering effect of his stroke, Clark's role in the special was reduced; he continued to make limited on-air appearances from Times Square Studios as co-host near midnight, and still conducted his traditional countdown, but Seacrest hosted the majority of the program outside in Times Square itself.

The 2008 edition featured live performances from Times Square by Carrie Underwood, Miley Cyrus, and the Jonas Brothers. Fergie of The Black Eyed Peas hosted concert segments from Hollywood, which also featured performances by Akon, Natasha Bedingfield, Sean Kingston, OneRepublic, Plain White T's, Taylor Swift and will.i.am. Seacrest's increased role as host was recognized beginning on the 2009 edition, as the special was officially renamed Dick Clark's New Year's Rockin' Eve with Ryan Seacrest'''. It featured live performances by the Jonas Brothers, Taylor Swift, and Lionel Richie, with Kellie Pickler serving as a correspondent. Hollywood segments featured performances by Fall Out Boy, Jesse McCartney, Natasha Bedingfield, Ne-Yo, The Pussycat Dolls, Solange, Robin Thicke and will.i.am.

For its 2010 edition, headlining performances in Times Square included Daughtry, and Jennifer Lopez (who infamously wore a dark-colored catsuit for her performance to mixed reviews), while Melissa Rycroft served as a correspondent. Fergie hosted concert segments on-location from Las Vegas, Nevada, featuring performances by her group The Black Eyed Peas, Colbie Caillat, Robin Thicke, Keri Hilson, Selena Gomez, Justin Bieber, David Guetta, and Orianthi. American Idol season 8 runner-up Adam Lambert stated that he was also reportedly scheduled to perform, but dropped from both Rockin' Eve and a scheduled appearance on fellow ABC program Jimmy Kimmel Live! in response to his controversial performance at the American Music Awards (which are also produced by Dick Clark Productions). Neither ABC nor Dick Clark Productions ever confirmed whether or not Lambert had been booked at all, however.

The 2011 edition featured live performances by Kesha, Taio Cruz and the supergroup NKOTBSB (the combined Backstreet Boys and New Kids on the Block), and actress Jenny McCarthy served as a reporter from Times Square. Fergie reprised her role as host for the pre-recorded Hollywood segments, which included performances by Avril Lavigne (which featured the world premiere of "What the Hell", the first single from her then-upcoming album Goodbye Lullaby), Natasha Bedingfield (who performed her latest single "Strip Me"), Jennifer Hudson, Ne-Yo, Train, Mike Posner, Willow Smith, Jason Derülo, Far East Movement, La Roux, Kesha, and Drake. Viewership for the 2011 edition peaked at around 19 million viewers.

2012: 40th anniversary

The 2011–12 edition was once again hosted by Seacrest, with Clark co-hosting what would become his final appearance on the program. Fergie co-hosted for the sixth consecutive year for the pre-taped Hollywood segments, while Jenny McCarthy returned for her second year corresponding from Times Square.  Musical guests in Times Square included Lady Gaga (who also joined Mayor Michael Bloomberg in activating the ball drop), Justin Bieber, Pitbull and Hot Chelle Rae. Performers in the Hollywood segments included Taio Cruz, Nicki Minaj, Blink-182, Florence and the Machine, LMFAO, Gym Class Heroes, OneRepublic (at Disneyland), The Band Perry, will.i.am, Christina Perri, and Robin Thicke. To celebrate the 40th anniversary of the first edition of New Year's Rockin' Eve aired in 1972, the primetime portion of the show was preceded by a two-hour retrospective special focusing on memorable music performances from the show's history.New Year's Rockin' Eve 2012 brought ABC's highest ratings on New Year's Eve since ABC 2000 Today; an average 8.4 million viewers watched the retrospective segment, the primetime hour brought in 12.9 million viewers, and the first hour of the main broadcast peaked at 22.6 million viewers. These numbers excluded viewership from locations such as bars and New Year's Eve parties, as Nielsen ratings do not account for out-of-home viewership (however, the company announced on October 24, 2016, that it would begin to offer out-of-home ratings data to broadcasters in April 2017).

2013–2016: Death of Dick Clark and aftermath
On April 18, 2012, Dick Clark died after suffering a heart attack following surgery to fix an enlarged prostate. Neither ABC or Dick Clark Productions immediately commented on the future of the program.

In August 2012, ABC confirmed via a press release that New Year's Rockin' Eve would return for its 2012–13 edition.  The primetime hour of this edition was preceded by a two-hour tribute special, New Year's Rockin' Eve Celebrates Dick Clark. Clark's legacy was also recognized by the Times Square Alliance, organizers of the ball drop: a triangular Waterford Crystal panel engraved with Dick Clark's name was presented to his widow Kari Wigton and installed on the ball.

On October 23, 2013, Dick Clark Productions confirmed the 2013–14 edition of New Year's Rockin' Eve, and announced that Ryan Seacrest had signed a multi-year deal of unspecified length to continue serving as host and executive producer of the special. Seacrest stated that he would "forever be both sentimental and grateful" about his involvement in the special, and that he was "excited to work together to create new traditions and fun moments on the show that only live television can deliver." Fellow producer Allen Shapiro credited Seacrest's involvement in New Year's Rockin' Eve for its "extended and expanded" success. That year, the special was aired in simulcast in Canada for first time by Citytv, replacing its coverage of concert festivities at Toronto's Nathan Phillips Square (the network's local station continued to sponsor the event, however). While viewership was down by 5%, New Year's Rockin' Eve was still the highest-rated among the New Year's specials.

On February 7, 2014, ABC announced that it had renewed both New Year's Rockin' Eve and the American Music Awards through 2023 and 2024, respectively. The 2016 edition featured One Direction's final U.S. television appearance before their planned hiatus. That year, New Year's Rockin' Eve was once again the highest rated of the New Year's Eve specials across the major networks; for the late-night portion, while overall household viewership was down by 7%, ratings in the 18–49 demographic were up by 3%.

2017–2020: New Orleans expansion, Mariah Carey incident and return

The 2017 edition expanded to feature coverage of New Year's Eve festivities in New Orleans hosted by Lucy Hale, with performances by Jason Derulo and Panic! at the Disco from the Sugar Bowl's Allstate Fan Fest concert, and Jackson Square's fleur-de-lis drop at midnight in the Central Time Zone. The segments are subsidized by New Orleans and the state of Louisiana as a means of promoting tourism. While household ratings for the late-night portion of the broadcast were down by 9% in comparison to 2016, New Year's Rockin' Eve was once again the highest-rated New Year's special across the major networks, with a 9.0 rating in metered markets, and a 6.8 rating among adults 18–49.

Mariah Carey was one of the Times Square headliners for the 2017 edition. Her performance was notably marred by technical issues; when opening with "Emotions", Carey remarked throughout the song that she was unable to hear her backing track. On her second song, "We Belong Together", she briefly sang the song with a backing track before abruptly stopping. A representative of the singer claimed that Carey had alerted production staff that her in-ear monitors were not working, but that they refused to address the situation, and alleged that they were "[setting] her up to fail". Dick Clark Productions denied any wrongdoing, stating that they "had no involvement" in the incident, and that the allegations by Carey's management that they had intentionally sabotaged her performance were "defamatory, outrageous and frankly absurd".

New Jersey's Casino Reinvestment Development Authority (CRDA) had announced plans for a live performance from Atlantic City's Boardwalk Hall by an unannounced artist, but these plans fell through, citing "scheduling conflicts and other considerations". The Philadelphia Inquirer reported that the CRDA's contract to host the DCP-produced Miss America pageant in Atlantic City contained provisions allowing "promotional accommodations" for the city in other DCP-produced programming, such as New Year's Rockin' Eve and the Billboard Music Awards.  Robert Mulcahy, chairman of the board for the CRDA, explained that Live Nation (which was to fund the broadcast using cash left over from cancelled beach concerts) were unable to find an act that met the approval of DCP, and added that local casinos declined to fund the performance, as they preferred to host their own parties rather than book major acts.

Despite the previous year's incident, Carey was subsequently invited to perform in Times Square again for New Year's Rockin' Eve 2018, in what media outlets described as an attempt at "redemption". The 2018 edition saw major ratings gains, especially in primetime; the 8:00–10:00 p.m. primetime segment reached 10.5 million viewers with a 3.1/13 rating among 18-49s, and the 10:00 p.m. hour reached 15.7 million viewers and a 5.0/20 rating among 18-49s—the highest ratings to date for the 10:00 p.m. segment. New Year's Rockin' Eves only major competitor on English-language network television was Fox's inaugural New Year's Eve with Steve Harvey, as NBC was committed to air Sunday Night Football if the NFL shifted a Week 17 game with playoff implications into primetime (however, the NFL decided against doing so, and NBC thus aired rerun programming in primetime instead).

On November 13, 2018, it was announced that YouTube Music would be a presenting sponsor of the 2019 edition. The service is also presenting sponsor of the DCP-produced American Music Awards. With the return of NBC's New Year's Eve after a hiatus, the 2019 edition experienced a decline in ratings to an 8.3 household share for its late-night portion, but was once again the top-rated among the New Year's specials.

On October 7, 2019, Jenny McCarthy stated on Live with Kelly and Ryan that she would not appear as the Times Square correspondent for the 2020 edition of New Year's Rockin' Eve, citing a desire to spend the holiday with her family, and her commitments to season 3 of Fox's The Masked Singer. Lucy Hale would serve as Times Square correspondent in place of McCarthy, and Billy Porter of the FX series Pose hosted the New Orleans segments in place of Hale, and also performed his song "Love Yourself". Ciara again hosted the Hollywood concert segments. Longtime ABC News journalist Barbara Walters (via file footage) and other ABC personalities also played into a social media meme involving her longtime intro to the ABC newsmagazine 20/20, by noting in a segment that "This is 2020". The broadcast also introduced a sponsored segment featuring a "first millionaire of 2020" promotion by the Powerball lottery.

 2021–present 
Hale and Porter were named Times Square correspondents for the 2021 edition. Cyndi Lauper performed a duet with Porter—who had been a cast member for her Broadway musical Kinky Boots. Due to the COVID-19 pandemic, both the Times Square and New Orleans celebrations televised by the special were held with no public attendance (with the former featuring a limited audience of essential workers and their families). The special featured an on-air interview between Seacrest and President-elect Joe Biden and his wife Jill Biden. Big Freedia hosted the New Orleans segments of the special.

In December 2020, it was reported that Mayor of New Orleans LaToya Cantrell had sent a letter to DCP requesting that Lauren Daigle (a Christian singer from Louisiana who had seen recent success as a pop crossover) not appear as a New Orleans-based performer for the special, citing her recent guest appearance during a worship event organized by Sean Feucht that was not approved by the city, and violated COVID-19-related public health orders.  After criticism of the letter by state lieutenant governor Billy Nungesser (who maintained that Daigle had mistaken it for a legitimate event), a DCP staff member told The Times-Picayune | The New Orleans Advocate that Daigle had not actually been booked at all.

On December 16, 2021, it was announced that Seacrest had signed a multi-year extension with DCP's parent company MRC (which discontinued Dick Clark Productions as a studio imprint in September 2021, and moved all of its productions under the MRC Live & Alternative banner; this change was reversed after the merger of MRC and Eldridge Industries' media properties was unwound in 2022) to continue his role as host and EP of New Year's Rockin' Eve''.

The 2022 edition–which marked the special's 50th anniversary–included segments from Distrito T-Mobile in San Juan, Puerto Rico hosted by Roselyn Sánchez and headlined by rapper Daddy Yankee, and the special's first broadcast of midnight celebrations in the Atlantic Time Zone to conclude the primetime block at 11:00 p.m. ET. Billy Porter returned as host of the New Orleans segments, while Liza Koshy reported from Times Square. D-Nice also made guest appearances for the Los Angeles segments alongside Ciara. While LL Cool J was originally announced as one of the headlining acts in Times Square, he was dropped on December 29 due to a COVID-19 infection. Chlöe was also dropped from the special for unspecified reasons. On December 31, ABC announced that Karol G had dropped out, but that Ashanti and Ja Rule had also joined the lineup.

ABC confirmed that Koshy, Porter, Ciara, and D-Nice would all return in their respective roles for the 2023 edition. To promote its upcoming "100 Years of Wonder" events for The Walt Disney Company's centennial year, concert segments were also filmed at Disneyland in Anaheim. The special also returned to Puerto Rico, with Farruko as featured performer. In a major change in scheduling emulating NBC's newly-introduced special the previous year, "Part 1" of the primetime block now ended at 10:00 p.m. ET/PT rather than 11, and resumed with "Part 2" at 10:30 p.m. ET/PT after late local news, which now straddled between prime time and late-night. The 11:30 p.m.—12:36 a.m. block containing the Times Square ball drop was now billed as "Part 1" of the late-night broadcast.

Viewership for the Times Square leg of the special saw a major year-over-year decline, falling from 19.6 million to 13.2 million viewers. However, ABC still finished first overall in total and key demographic audience share.

Specials

References

External links
 Feature Page for ABC's Dick Clark's New Year's Rockin' Eve with Ryan Seacrest
 Archived Feature Page for ABC's Dick Clark's New Year's Rockin' Eve with Ryan Seacrest
 
 
 
 
 
 
 
 
 
 
 

1972 American television series debuts
1980s American television series
1990s American television series
2000s American television series
2010s American television series
2020s American television series
American annual television specials
American Broadcasting Company original programming
English-language television shows
Music television specials
NBC original programming
New Year's television specials
Television series by Dick Clark Productions
Television series by Media Rights Capital
Television series by Ryan Seacrest Productions
Times Square
Television shows filmed in New York City
Dick Clark